Lophozozymus is a genus of crabs in the family Xanthidae, containing the following species:

 Lophozozymus anaglyptus (Heller, 1861)
 Lophozozymus bertonciniae Guinot & Richer de Forges, 1981
 Lophozozymus cristatus A. Milne-Edwards, 1867
 Lophozozymus dodone (Herbst, 1801)
 Lophozozymus edwardsi Odhner, 1925
 Lophozozymus erinnyes Ng & Chia, 1997
 Lophozozymus evestigatus Guinot, 1977
 Lophozozymus glaber Ortmann, 1843
 Lophozozymus guezei Guinot, 1977
 Lophozozymus incisus (H. Milne-Edwards, 1834)
 Lophozozymus pictor (Fabricius, 1798)
 Lophozozymus pulchellus A. Milne-Edwards, 1867
 Lophozozymus rathbunae Ward, 1942
 Lophozozymus simplex De Man, 1888
 Lophozozymus superbus (Dana, 1852)

References

Xanthoidea